Ælfheah the Bald is the commonly used name for Ælfheah (died 12 March 951), the first English Bishop of Winchester of that name. He is sometimes known as Alphege, an older translation of his Old English name.

Life

Ælfheah may have been a relative of Dunstan. He certainly began his career as a monk at the court of King Athelstan of England and was made Bishop of Winchester in 934 or 935 . He was an early mover towards the monastic reforms of the next generation and was tutor of Aethelwold. He died on 12 March 951 and was buried in Old Minster in Winchester. He was subsequently revered as a saint.

Citations

References

 
 Walsh, Michael A New Dictionary of Saints: East and West London: Burns & Oates 2007

External links
 
 Catholic Online Saints and Angels: Alphege

10th-century Christian saints
West Saxon saints
Bishops of Winchester
951 deaths
Year of birth unknown
10th-century English bishops